The National Professional Basketball League (NPBL) was a professional basketball league in the United States from 1950–51, serving as a successor league to the National Basketball League that operated from 1937 to 1949.

History
The National Basketball Association contracted after the 1949–1950 season, losing six teams: The Anderson Packers, Sheboygan Red Skins and Waterloo Hawks jumped to the NPBL, while the Chicago Stags, Denver Nuggets and St. Louis Bombers folded. The league went from 17 teams to 11 before the 1950–1951 season started. Midway through the 1950–1951 season, the Washington Capitols folded as well, bringing the number of teams in the league down to ten.

The National Professional Basketball League was formed around the former NBA teams, with teams added in new larger markets. The charter teams were the East Division: Sheboygan Redskins (Former NBA), Anderson Packers (Former NBA), Louisville Alumnites and Grand Rapids Hornets. West Division: Denver Refiners/Evansville Agogans,  Saint Paul Lights, Kansas City Hi-Spots and Waterloo Hawks (Former NBA).

The league played just one season, with no championship finals ever being staged. Doxie Moore served as commissioner. The Grand Rapids Hornets, Kansas City Hi-Spots, Louisville Alumnites and Saint Paul Lights franchised folded during the season and the Denver Refiners relocated to Evansville, Indiana to become the Evansville Agogans.

The Sheboygan Red Skins and Waterloo Hawks both claimed the championship because they were each in first in their divisions at the end of the season, but they never met in a playoff series.

1950–1951 Standings

Eastern Division
 Sheboygan Red Skins
 Louisville Alumnites
 Anderson Packers
 Grand Rapids Hornets

Western Division
 Waterloo Hawks
 Denver Refiners/Evansville Agogans
 Saint Paul Lights
 Kansas City Hi-Spots

References

 
1950 establishments in the United States
1951 disestablishments
Defunct professional sports leagues in the United States
Defunct basketball leagues in the United States